Amok is a 1934 French film, directed by Fyodor Otsep. The director was nominated for the Mussolini Cup at the 1934 Venice International Film Festival.  The movie centers on a physician, Dr. Holk, in a small Dutch colony in the tropics. A strange illness, known as Amok, is turning innocent people into madmen.  When a young woman, Hèlène, comes to him asking for an abortion so that her returning husband will not know she has been unfaithful, he refuses. Hélène seeks help elsewhere, leading Dr. Holk to try to find and save her before it's too late.

External links

1934 films
Films about abortion
Films based on works by Stefan Zweig
Films directed by Fedor Ozep
Films set in Indonesia
French black-and-white films
1934 drama films
French drama films
1930s French films
1930s French-language films